Sheikh Ibrahim or Shaikh Ibrahim may refer to:

Sheikh Ibrahim Shāh, Safaviyya Tariqa Shaykh during the period of 1429-1447, the father of famous Safaviyya Sheikh Junāyd and the great grand-father of Shāh Ismāʿīl of the founder of Safavids
Shaikh Ibrahim, Iraq, town in northern Iraq
Sheikh Ibrahim Bin Abdullah Al-Ghaith, former General President for the Saudi Committee for the Propagation of Virtue and the Prevention of Vice
Shaikh Ibrahim al-Haidari, Iraqi historian
Sheikh Ibrahim al-Nama'a, Iraqi imam and Islamist
Sheikh Ibrahim Mudayris, Palestinian imam
Sheikh Ibrahim Khaleel, Nigerian Islamic scholar
Shaikh Ibrahim Memon Madani, Saudi Arabian imam and Islamic scholar
Johann Ludwig Burckhardt, the name that Burckhardt travelled under in the Middle East, also the name by which he was referred to in other travel books from that era